Friedrich Wilhelm Graf zu Limburg-Stirum (6 August 1835, The Hague – 27 October 1912) was a German nobleman, diplomat and politician.

Biography
By birth a member of an ancient House of Limburg-Stirum, he was the son of Count Frederik Adrian of Limburg-Stirum (1804–1874). Friedrich Wilhem served as acting Foreign Secretary and head of the Foreign Office from September 1880 to 25 June 1881. Having until then served as Deputy Secretary of State in the Foreign Office, he was appointed as Foreign Secretary after Chlodwig, Prince of Hohenlohe-Schillingsfürst resigned from this position. He was subsequently succeeded by Clemens Busch as acting Secretary.

He was a member of the Reichstag from 1898 to 1903. In 1904, he was given an honorary doctorate of law by the University of Wisconsin–Madison.

Marriage and issue

In 1865, he married Paula Minette Therese Nanny Amalie von Meyerinck (born 1844, died 1925), and they had issue:

 Johanna (1866–1944); she married in 1887 Count Günther von Tschirschky und Bögendorff (d.1914);
 Theodora (1867–1953); she married in 1902 Count August von Pückler-Groditz (d.1937);
 Friedrich (1871–1953); he married in 1907 Lucie von Lieres und Wilkau (1885–1909);
 Richard (1874–1931); he married in 1914 Baroness Edith von Bodenhausen (1888–1961);
 Menno (1881–1953); he married in 1916 (divorced 1918) Hildegard Wertheim (1894–1919).

External links 

1835 births
1912 deaths
Politicians from The Hague
Friedrich von Limburg Stirum
German Protestants
German Conservative Party politicians
Foreign Secretaries of Germany
Members of the 9th Reichstag of the German Empire
Members of the 10th Reichstag of the German Empire
Members of the 11th Reichstag of the German Empire
Members of the Prussian House of Representatives